"Computer Blue" is a song by Prince and The Revolution. Released on June 25, 1984, it is the fourth track on Prince's sixth album, Purple Rain, which also served as the soundtrack to the film of the same name. In the film, the song represents Prince's character's angst at the budding relationship between the characters played by Morris Day and Apollonia, the latter of whom he desires, and he performs it in front of the two during The Revolution's set at a nightclub with the aim of upsetting them. The song was composed by Prince with credit to his father, John L. Nelson, for the guitar solo based on a piano instrumental written by Nelson and Prince. He titled the instrumental piece "Father's Song" and recorded it on piano for the film, though onscreen it was portrayed as being played by Prince's character's father, played by Clarence Williams III. On the box-set Purple Rain Deluxe (2017), a different and longer recording of "Father's Song" was included.

"Computer Blue" was originally recorded at The Warehouse in Minneapolis with The Revolution a day after "Let's Go Crazy", and was later overdubbed at Sunset Sound in Los Angeles in August 1983. Prince, along with Wendy & Lisa and sound engineer Susan Rogers, set about doing further work on what would later end up being placed on the album Purple Rain, albeit in a very heavily edited form. The song begins with spoken lyrics by Wendy & Lisa which suggest a dominatrix-type relationship. The song then explodes into an experimental rock number with screaming, heavy synths, distorted guitars, and lyrics about the relationship between humans and computers. The released version has only one verse; the version that debuted at the First Avenue nightclub had a second verse, as did the song when it was originally recorded, and this original recording (later released as the "Hallway Speech" version) lasts for over 12 minutes.

Outtake
Originally conceived as a 14-minute opus, "Computer Blue" would later be edited down several times for inclusion on Purple Rain. The song was edited from a fully-mastered 7:30 down to its current length when "Take Me with U" was added to the album at the last minute. The full-length version of the song contains extended instrumental solos and additional lyrics. Also present is a repeated synthesizer segment with a sing-a-long chant, which was often played in live versions of the song. The synth part, without the vocals, made it into the film Purple Rain during a scene in which the Revolution rehearses while waiting for Prince to arrive. The track ends with three full minutes of screeching feedback. A shorter version, 12 minutes in length, was the one edited down to the album's version, and the feedback from this version forms the segue into "Darling Nikki" on Purple Rain itself. Widely regarded by hardcore Prince fans as a masterpiece, the original unedited recording features the infamous "Hallway Speech" (as termed by fans) about emotions likened to different rooms. During the Purple Rain performance, at the end of the song before "Darling Nikki" begins, the "Righteous 1" speech spoken by Wendy & Lisa cut from the final version of the track is played. A 12:18 edit of the "Hallway Speech" version was officially released on the 2017 deluxe re-release of Purple Rain.

Personnel
Credits are adapted from the Prince Vault and the album's liner notes.
 Prince – lead vocals, lead guitar, piano
 Wendy Melvoin – rhythm  guitar, spoken intro, background vocals 
 Lisa Coleman – keyboards, spoken intro, background vocals 
 Dr. Matt Fink – keyboards, background vocals
 Brown Mark – bass guitar, background vocals
 Bobby Z. – drums, percussion

References in other media
In a "Charlie Murphy's True Hollywood Stories" sketch on Chappelle's Show, "Computer Blue" is referenced as the name of a play drawn up by Prince (Dave Chappelle) while playing Murphy in basketball.

References

1984 songs
Prince (musician) songs
Songs written by Prince (musician)
Song recordings produced by Prince (musician)
Songs written by Lisa Coleman (musician)
Songs written by Wendy Melvoin
Songs written for films